Berezan is a city in Brovary Raion, Kyiv Oblast (region) of Ukraine. It hosts the administration of Berezan urban hromada, one of the hromadas of Ukraine. Population: .

There is an important railway junction in the city. By rail, the distance to Kiev is 65 km.

History 
Berezań was first mentioned in Kiev Voivodeship chronicles in 1616. It was part of the voivodeship as a royal city of Poland until 1667, when it passed to Russia.

According to the main version, the name Berezań comes from the name of the Berezanka river that runs near the city. Similar to another river that is also close to the town of Cuchoberezica. These rivers are named after natural conditions. On the banks of the river Beraznka there are birch forests (Brzozy in Ukrainian: Bereza). At Suchoberezice - dry shores. Now, in the past, Berezanka is called Nadra. In the lustration from 1620 it is written that in the towns of the Perejasław starosty, Berezani, Byków, Jabłonowo and Myrgorod, celit is produced, which brings abundant income annually. The files of the Lublin Tribunal from the end of the 16th and beginning of the 17th centuries inform that Berezań actively accepted refugees from right-bank Ukraine, mostly from Chodorków.

The files of the Lublin Tribunal from the end of the 16th and beginning of the 17th centuries indicate that Berezań actively accepted refugees from the right-bank of Ukraine, mostly from Chodorków.

In the first half of the 17th century, before the Chmielnicki uprising, until 1620 Berezań was the town of the Perejasław starosty and belonged to Janusz Ostrowski. After his death, the towns of Berezań, Byków, Jabłonów, Myrgorod, formerly separated from the Perejasław starosty and by order of Zygmunt III, were handed over to Jan Czernyszewski for the production of celite.

In 1621, by another royal order, the production of celite in the Kiev province and throughout Ukraine was transferred to the bailiff Bartłomiej Obałkowski. In the 1730s, Berezań becomes the center of the Berezan Cossack Hundred of the Perejasław Regiment. At the very beginning of the Chmielnicki uprising, the hetman turned to Prince Jeremia Wiszniewiecki, who was then standing in a camp near Berezania. The messengers brought the prince a letter from Chmielnicki in which he explained the reasons for the insurrection and encouraged Wiśniowiecki not to engage in fights between the Cossacks and the Crown troops.

In 1674, Hetman Iwan Samojłowicz, with his universal, handed over to Colonel Perejasławski Dmytraszka Rajcz the lands he had already bought, including the town of Berezań.

In 1688, another hetman, Ivan Mazepa, once again confirmed with his order the right to the ownership of Rajczewo. According to the "general slippery about estates" (a list of estates), which was drawn up in all ten regiments of left-bank Ukraine in the years 1729–1731, there were 37 manors in Berezania and it was owned by the family of Colonel Dmytraszka Rajcz.

In 1764, the Perejasław regiment, which included a hundred of Berezan, was incorporated into the newly created Malorussian governorate. After the liquidation of the regimental system in left-bank Ukraine and the reorganization of the Lesser Russian governorates into the Kiev, Chernihiv and Novgorod-Siwerski governorship in 1782, Berezan was included in the perejasławski district of the Kiev governorship.

In 1796, the Lesser-Russian governorate was re-established, so Berezań was part of the Perejasławski county until its division in 1802 of the Lesser-Russian governorate into Czernigowska and Połtawska.

From 1802, Berezań was the freedom center of the Perejasławski district of the Poltava governorate. As a result of another administrative reform in the years 1922–1923, when s were converted into districts and freedom into districts, Berezan became the district center of the Kiev district. In 1932, after the districts were liquidated, Berezan becomes the district center of the newly formed Kiev region.

From 1962 to 1965, the town of Berezań was part of the Perejasław-Khmelnytskyi district of the Kiev region. In 1994, Berezan was transferred to the category of cities of district competence of the Kiev region.

In 1843, the well-known poet and painter Taras Shevchenko visited Berezani, where he wrote his work "Dug up grave".

in 1927, in the city of Berezani, director Arnold Kurdiuk made one of the first full-length films, "Jamalma".

Until 18 July 2020, Berezan was incorporated as a city of oblast significance. In July 2020, as part of the administrative reform of Ukraine, which reduced the number of raions of Kyiv Oblast to seven, the city of Berezan was merged into Brovary Raion.

Geography 
The climate is temperate-continental, with a warm summer that lasts, and sometimes moderately unstable winters, with little snowfall. The soil is mostly black earth, fertile, there is little lime, slate and sun. The city is surrounded by coniferous and mixed forests, birch groves. The town is rich in water resources: two rivers Nedra and Trubiż-prytoki dnieper, numerous ponds and the Central Lake. There are layers of peat and clay suitable for the production of brick, fine-grained sands, sources of mineral water, from which beer was previously produced.

References

Cities in Kyiv Oblast
Pereyaslavsky Uyezd
Cities of regional significance in Ukraine